The 1958 Furman Purple Hurricane football team was an American football team that represented Furman University as a member of the Southern Conference (SoCon) during the 1958 NCAA University Division football season. In their first season under head coach Bob King, Furman compiled an overall record of 2–7 with a mark of 1–2 in conference play, placing eighth in the SoCon.

Schedule

References

Furman
Furman Paladins football seasons
Furman Purple Hurricane football